Suparshvanatha, also known as Suparśva, was the seventh Jain Tīrthankara of the present age (avasarpini). He was born to King Pratistha and Queen Prithvi at Varanasi on 12 Jestha Shukla in the Ikshvaku clan. He is said to have attained moksha at Shikharji on the sixth day of the dark half of the month of Phālguna.

Jain biography

Life before renunciation 
Suparśvanātha was the seventh Jain Tīrthankara of the present age (avasarpini). He was born to King Pratishtha and Queen Prithvi at Varanasi on 12 Jestha Shukla in the Ikshvaku clan. There is temple dedicated to Suparshvanatha built in Bhadaini, Varanasi to commemorate the birth of Suparshvanatha. Nine months before the birth of Suparśvanātha, Queen Prithivī dreamt the sixteen most auspicious dreams. Suparśvanātha spent 5 lakh pūrva as youth (kumāra kāla) and ruled His kingdom for 14 lakh pūrva and 20 pūrvāṇga (rājya kāla). Suparśvanātha was married and ruled after his father King Pratistha. He conducted affairs in state and looked after well being of individual.

Renunciation 
According to Jain legends, When he observed tree leaves falling and flower wilting, he renounced his worldly life. He gave his kingdom to his son and became a Jain ascetic. After 9 months and then obtained Kevala Jnana (omniscience). After a many years of spreading his knowledge, he is said to have attained nirvana at Sammed Shikharji on the sixth day of the dark half of the month of Phālguna.

Disciples 
According to Jain texts Balladatta Svami was the leader of the Suparśvanātha disciples and 20 lakh years he also achieved nirvana.

As a historical figure
The Yajurveda is also said to have mentioned the name of Suparśvanātha but the meaning is different. It is an epithet of God which means "All-Pure Lord".

The Mahavagga book of the Khandhaka (1. 22. 13), a Buddhist text, mentions a temple of Suparśvanātha situated at Rajgir in the time of Gautama Buddha.

At Mathura, there is an old stupa with the inscription of 157 CE. This inscription records that an image of the tīrthankara Aranatha was set up at the stupa built by the gods. However, Somadeva Suri stated in Yashstilaka and Jinaprabha Suri in Vividha Tirtha Kalpa that the stupa was erected for Suparśvanātha.

Adoration 
Svayambhūstotra by Acharya Samantabhadra is the adoration of twenty-four Tīrthankaras. Its five slokas (aphorisms) are dedicated to Tīrthankara Suparśvanātha.

 Suparshvanatha is associated with Nandavarta (Dig.) & Svastika (Svet.) emblem, Sirisa tree, Varanandin (Dig.) & Matanga (Svet.) Yaksha and Kali (Dig.) & Santa (Svet.) Yakshi.

In literature 
Supasnath Chariyam was compiled during reign of Mokkhal in 1422-23 at Dilwara.

Iconography 
Suparshvanatha is usually depicted in a lotus or kayotsarga posture. Statues and paintings show his head shielded by a multi-headed serpent, fanned out like an umbrella. 

Serpent-hood iconography is not unique to Suparshvanatha; it is also found above the icons of Parshvanatha, the 23rd of the 24 tirthankaras, but with a small difference. Suparshvanatha's serpent hood has five heads, and a seven (or more)-headed serpent is found in Parshvanatha icons. Statues of both tirthankaras with serpent hoods have been found in Uttar Pradesh and Tamil Nadu, dating to the 5th to 10th centuries.

Unlike Parshvantha who is depicted with coils of snake behind the body, Suparshva is depicted with snake hood only overhead. Suparshva's emblem of swastika is carved (or stamped) beneath his legs as an icon identifier.

Main temples 
 Suparshvanatha temple, Pavagadh
 Mandaragiri
 Shri Mandavagadh Teerth, Mandu
 Suparshavanath Jain Basadi, Bhadaini
 Suparshavanath Jain Basadi, Narlai : believed to be more than 1000 years old.

See also

God in Jainism
Arihant (Jainism)
Jainism and non-creationism
Ikshvaku dynasty

References

Citations

Sources

External links
 Harvard Pluralism Project: Jainism

Tirthankaras
Solar dynasty